The Whitney Biennial is a biennial exhibition of contemporary American art, typically by young and lesser known artists, on display at the Whitney Museum of American Art in New York City, United States. The event began as an annual exhibition in 1932; the first biennial was in 1973. The Whitney show is generally regarded as one of the leading shows in the art world, often setting or leading trends in contemporary art. It helped bring artists like Georgia O'Keeffe, Jackson Pollock, and Jeff Koons to prominence.

Artists

In 2010, for the first time a majority of the 55 artists included in that survey of contemporary American art were women. The 2012 exhibition featured 51 artists, the smallest number in the event's history.

The fifty-one artists for 2012 were selected by curator Elisabeth Sussman and freelance curator Jay Sanders. It was open for three months up to 27 May 2012 and presented for the first time "heavy weight" on dance, music and theatre. Those performance art variations were open to spectators all day long in a separate floor.

History
The Whitney Museum had a long history beginning in 1932 of having a large group exhibition of invited American artists every year called the 'Whitney Annual'. In the late sixties, it was decided to alternate between painting and sculpture, although by the 1970s the decision was to combine both together in a biennial. The first Biennial occurred in 1973. Since then, the biennials have pursued a different curatorial approach to include all media.

In the past the Whitney Museum has tried different ways to organize its biennial. It has used its own staff members and invited outside curators, including Europeans, to present the show. In 2010 it even asked a former art dealer, Jay Sanders, who would later become a Whitney curator, to help organize one.

The Whitney Biennial often extends to sculpture exhibitions in Central Park. The 2008 edition took over the Park Avenue Armory as a space for performance and installation art. The 2014 Whitney Biennial is the last one in the museum's Marcel Breuer building. The museum is leaving the Upper East Side for the meatpacking district, where it is scheduled to open its new building, designed by Renzo Piano, in 2015.

In 1987, the show was protested by the Guerrilla Girls for its alleged sexism and racism.

Still referred to as the "political" biennial, the 1993 edition included works like Pepón Osorio's installation Scene of the Crime (Whose Crime?) of a Hispanic family's living room and Daniel Joseph Martinez's metal buttons bearing the message "I can't imagine ever wanting to be white." The 1993 Whitney Biennial was the most diverse exhibit by a major American museum up until that time. In 1970 less than 1% of artists at the Whitney Museum were non-white. In 1991, only 10% of artists were non white. Vanessa Faye Johnson stated that despite intentions, the "lack of exchange and dialogue, the simplification of complex issues in the Biennial" effectively cast the artists largely as victims in the eyes of the public. Roberta Smith, an art critic for The New York Times, called it "pious, [and] often arid". The art historian Robert Hughes vehemently criticized lack of painting, and the "wretched pictorial ineptitude" of the artists, dismissed the abundance of text as "useless, boring mock documentation", and mocked the focus on "exclusion and marginalization ... [in] a world made bad for blacks, Latinos, gays, lesbians and women in general." The largely shared sentiment was that the public felt alienated by the confrontational demands of the artwork. It was the first Whitney Biennial to treat video works with the same attention to space as sculpture, designating two entire galleries to them. Text-heavy Installations demanded attention and participation from the audience. The artists made it extremely difficult to take in the work as a passive viewer.

Since 2000, the Bucksbaum Award has been awarded to an artist exhibiting at the Biennial.

The 2014 Whitney Biennial was also somewhat controversial for its lack of diversity, 9 out of the 109 artists were black or African American, including Donelle Woolford, a fictional character developed by 52-year-old white artist Joe Scanlan. She was the only black female artist included in curator Michelle Grabner's exhibition. Eunsong Kim and Maya Isabella Mackrandilal criticized the piece: "The insertion of people of color into white space doesn't make it less colonial or more radical—that's the rhetoric of imperialistic multiculturalism, a bullshit passé theory." and suggest this pieces treats "othered bodies [as] subcontractable."

Additionally, The YAMS Collective, or HOWDOYOUSAYYAMINAFRICAN?, a collective of 38 mostly black and queer artists, writers, composers, academics, filmmakers and performers participated and withdrew from the 2014 Biennial as a protest of the Whitney Museum's policies.

Yams Collective member and artist Sienna Shields said "Every Whitney Biennial I have ever been to, you can barely count the number of black artists in the show on one hand. I didn't want to be a part of that," Shields said. "There are so many amazing artists of color that I have known in the past 12 years in New York that are essentially overlooked. But I just felt it was time for an intervention." Poet Christa Bell explained: "[O]ur entire participation was a protest... Just because people don't know that doesn't mean it is any less of a protest. Withdrawal was the final act of protest. Black people en masse being inside of an institution like the Whitney, presenting art, is itself a form of protest. We just followed it through to its inevitable conclusion."

The 2017 Whitney Biennial featured a controversial painting of Emmett Till, entitled Open Casket by Dana Schutz, which sparked protest and a highly circulated petition calling for the painting to be removed and destroyed.

The 2019 Whitney Biennial was boycotted by a group of artists, in protest of the museum's vice chairman, Warren Kanders. Warrren Kanders' companies sell military supplies (teargas and bullets) via Safariland. These bullets were used by Israeli forces and snipers during the 2018–2019 Gaza border protests. The United Nations released a report that claimed Israeli security forces may have committed war crimes and should be held individually and collectively accountable for the deaths of 189 Palestinian protesters in Gaza. As such, the 2019 Whitney Biennial was labelled "The Tear Gas Biennial" by Hannah Black, Ciarán Finlayson, and Tobi Haslett in an open letter on Artforum. The artists who withdrew from include: Korakrit Arunanondchai, Meriem Bennani, Nicole Eisenman, Nicholas Galanin, Eddie Arroyo, Christine Sun Kim, Agustina Woodgate, and Forensic Architecture. The Forensic Architecture biennial submission, “Triple-Chaser” (2019), collected evidence, ammunition rounds, and eyewitness testimony that links Warrren Kanders to the killings and maiming of Palestinians. It is a collaboration with documentary filmmaker Laura Poitras.

See also
 2022 Whitney Biennial
Visual arts of the United States
List of Whitney Biennial curators
 The Catalog Committee

References

External links

Artkrush.com interview with 2006 Whitney Biennial co-curator Philippe Vergne (March 2006) 
Review of 2006 Whitney Biennial 
 2008 Whitney Biennial 
Whitney Museum of American Art Main Page

Art biennials
1932 in art
1932 establishments in New York (state)
Events in New York City